The 2012–13 NCAA Division III men's ice hockey season began on October 18, 2012, and concluded on March 16, 2013. This was the 40th season of Division III college ice hockey.

Regular season

Season tournaments

Standings

Note: Mini-game are not included in final standings

2013 NCAA Tournament

See also
 2012–13 NCAA Division I men's ice hockey season
 2012–13 NCAA Division II men's ice hockey season

References

External links

 
NCAA